Everett High School is a public, magnet high school located on the south side of Lansing, Michigan.

Athletics 
Everett's sports teams are known as the Vikings, known for their rivalry with the Big Reds of JW Sexton High School, and were Class A State Champions in Boys Basketball in 1977 and 2004. Retrieved on 26 November 2008. Also back-to-back Class A State Champions in 2001, 2000 and Class A State Runners-up in 1999 in Girls Basketball. Everett was the Class A state champion in Track and Field under coach Ron Barr in 1983 and 1985.

Notable alumni
 Bruce Fields, former MLB player (Detroit Tigers, Seattle Mariners)
  Earvin Magic Johnson, former Los Angeles Lakers player, NCAA champion at Michigan State, Gold Medalist with the 1992 United States men's Olympic basketball team and Naismith Memorial Basketball Hall of Famer
 Lisa Kron, American actress and playwright, 2015 winner of Tony Award for Best Original Score and for Best Book of a Musical for Fun Home.
 Bruce Look, former MLB player (Minnesota Twins)
 Dean Look, former MLB player (Chicago White Sox) and NFL referee
 Goran Suton, former NBA player for the Utah Jazz
 Carl Thomas, former NBA player (Golden State Warriors)
 Charles Thomas, former NBA player (Detroit Pistons)
 Carol Hutchins, Michigan Wolverines softball coach
 Alexa Canady, first black female neurosurgeon

External links 
 Everett High School Home Page

References 

Education in Lansing, Michigan
Public high schools in Michigan
Educational institutions established in 1923
Schools in Ingham County, Michigan
Magnet schools in Michigan
1923 establishments in Michigan